Greenwich Hospital Act is a stock short title used in the United Kingdom for legislation relating to the Greenwich Hospital charity.

List
10 Ann c 27 is sometimes referred to as the Greenwich Hospital, etc. Act 1711
13 & 14 Vict c 24 is sometimes referred to as the Greenwich Hospital Act 1850
The Greenwich Hospital (Provision for Widows) Act 1863 (26 & 27 Vict c 67)
The Greenwich Hospital (Disused Burial Ground) Act 1925 (15 & 16 Geo 5 c 58)

The Greenwich Hospital Acts 1865 to 1892 is the collective title of the following Acts:
The Greenwich Hospital Act 1865 (28 & 29 Vict c 89)
The Greenwich Hospital Act 1869 (32 & 33 Vict c 44)
The Greenwich Hospital Act 1872 (35 & 36 Vict c 67)
The Greenwich Hospital Act 1883 (46 & 47 Vict c 32)
The Greenwich Hospital Act 1885 (48 & 49 Vict c 42)
The Naval Knights of Windsor (Dissolution) Act 1892 (55 & 56 vict c 34)

Section 6 of the Greenwich Hospital Act 1898 (61 & 62 Vict c 24) provided that that Act could be cited with the Greenwich Hospital Acts 1865 to 1892.

The Greenwich Hospital Acts 1865 to 1921 was the collective title of the Greenwich Hospital Acts 1865 to 1898 and the Greenwich Hospital Act 1921 (11 & 12 Geo 5 c 41).

The Greenwich Hospital Acts 1865 to 1942 is the collective title of the Greenwich Hospital Acts 1865 to 1921 and the Greenwich Hospital Act 1942 (5 & 6 Geo 6 c 35).

The Greenwich Hospital Acts 1865 to 1947 is the collective title of the Greenwich Hospital Acts 1865 to 1942 and the Greenwich Hospital Act 1947 (10 & 11 Geo 6 c 5)

The Greenwich Hospital Acts 1865 to 1967 is the collective title of the Greenwich Hospital Acts 1865 to 1947 and the Greenwich Hospital Act 1967 (c 74).

The Greenwich Hospital Acts 1865 to 1990 is the collective title of the Greenwich Hospital Acts 1865 to 1967 and the Greenwich Hospital Act 1990 (c 13).

The Greenwich Hospital Acts 1865 to 1870 was the collective title of the Greenwich Hospital Acts 1865 and 1869 and the Greenwich Hospital Act 1870 (33 & 34 Vict c 100).
 
The Greenwich Hospital Acts 1865 to 1872 was the collective title of the Greenwich Hospital Acts 1865 to 1870 and the Greenwich Hospital Act 1872 (35 & 36 Vict c 67).

See also
List of short titles

References

Lists of legislation by short title and collective title
Charity law